The Courtship is an American reality television dating game show that premiered on NBC on March 6, 2022.

Format

Court 
Mr. Claude Remy (Father)
Dr. Claire Spain-Remy (Mother)
Mrs. Danielle "Danie" Baker (Sister)
Ms. Tessa Cleary (Best Friend)

Contestants

The contestants were revealed on February 14, 2022.

Elimination chart

Production
On July 7, 2021, it was announced that Peacock had made a series order for a dating show titled Pride & Prejudice: An Experiment in Romance. On February 1, 2022, it was announced that the series, titled The Courtship, will move to NBC and premiere on March 6, 2022. On February 14, 2022, the leading lady and suitors were announced. On March 16, 2022, the series was moved from NBC to USA Network due to low ratings.

Episodes

Reception

References

External links

2020s American game shows
2020s American reality television series
2022 American television series debuts
American dating and relationship reality television series
English-language television shows
NBC original programming
Television series by Endemol
Television shows set in England
USA Network original programming